The Alake of Egbaland is the paramount Yoruba king of the Egba, a clan in Abeokuta, Ogun State, southwestern Nigeria. Egba consists of Egba Ake, Owu kingdom, Oke-Ona and Egba Gbagura.

History
Sagbua Okukenu became the first Alake of Egbaland, ruling between 8 August 1854 to 31 August 1862. Prior to the appointment of the Sagbua Okukenu in 1846, Shomoye was installed as regent for one year, between 1845 and 1846, and following the demise of Oba Okukenu in 1862, Shomoye returned to the throne of the Alake of Egbaland as a regent, where he spent four years between 1862 and 1866. Following this, Oba Ademola I was appointed on 28 November 1869. He ruled for eight years until his demise on 30 December 1877.
On 1 January 1878, Oba Oyekan was appointed as the Alake of Egbaland. He spent three years on the throne before his demise on 18 December 1881. Thereafter, Oluwaji was appointed on 9 February 1885, and ruled in this capacity for four years (27 January 1889).
After a two-year vacancy, Oba Oshokalu was appointed Alake on 18 September 1891. He ruled in this capacity for seven years until his demise on 11 June 1898.
On 8 August 1898 Oba Gbadebo I became the Alake of Egbaland. He spent twenty-two years on the throne until his death on 28 May 1920. He died at the age of 66 (1854–1920).
Following the demise of Oba Gbadebo I in 1920, Oba Ladapo Ademola II became the new ruler. He ruled for 42 years, two of which were spent in exile between 1948 and December 1950.
After his death on 27 December 1962, the throne was vacant for one year and on 12 August 1963, Oba Adesina Samuel Gbadebo II was appointed as the new Alake of Egbaland. After the death of Adesina Samuel Gbadebo on 26 October 1971, Samuel Oyebade Lipede became the king. He ruled in this capacity for 33 years until his demise in February 2005, which led to the appointment of Adedotun Aremu Gbadebo III

List of the Alakes of Egbaland, originally of Ake:

See also
Egba Alake

References

Yoruba history
Nigerian traditional rulers
Yoruba royal titles